is a Japanese manga series written and illustrated by Hirohiko Araki, and the ninth part of the larger JoJo's Bizarre Adventure series. Set in Hawaii in the 2020s, it follows Jodio Joestar, a teenaged gangster intent on becoming wealthy. It is serialized by Shueisha in the seinen manga  magazine Ultra Jump since February 17, 2023.

Plot
Jodio Joestar is a high schooler living with his family on Oahu, Hawaii, intent on becoming rich through the "mechanisms" of daily life. Working alongside his older sibling Dragona and his kleptomaniac classmate Paco Laburantes, Jodio is led into gang activities by his principal, Meryl Mei Qi.

Characters

 Jodio Joestar is a 15-year-old gangster living with his family on Oahu, Hawaii, where he acts as a gofer for the state's underground drug trade. Despite his popularity among his peers, he finds it difficult to be truly happy and is diagnosed with antisocial personality disorder. Using his stand, November Rain, he can create raindrops with crushing force.  
  Dragona Joestar is Jodio's 18-year-old sibling, who in addition to being part of the gang works in a fashion boutique. Despite being born male, Dragona gets breast implants and keeps up a feminine aesthetic. Their stand, Smooth Operators, consists of small robots capable of displacing things.
 Paco Laburantes is a 19-year-old classmate of Jodio's, and part of the gang. He comes from an abusive household, having one of his ears partially bitten off by his father, and engages in theft as if it were a sport. Using his stand, The Hustle, he can bulge his muscles to grab objects without using his hands, aiding him in sleights of hand.
 Usagi Alohaoe is a 17-year-old classmate of Jodio's, who takes part in stealing the diamond under Meryl Mei Qi's request. He is also one of Meryl's most frequent customers, causing his other accomplices to rule him off as an addict and a hinderance. Using his stand, The Matte Kudasai,  he can use an existing object to transform into what someone else wants it to be, excluding his own wishes.
 Meryl Mei Qi is the principal of Jodio's school and owner of a fashion boutique, who is also the boss of Jodio and his classmates. She instructs them to steal a diamond from a then unknown Japanese tourist visiting the islands.
 Barbara Ann Joestar is the mother of Jodio and Dragona Joestar. Due to the support of her children, everyone respects her and assists her when needed.
 Rohan Kishibe is a successful Japanese manga artist visiting Hawaii for a 15-day vacation. Jodio and his classmates are tasked with stealing a diamond from his villa.

Production and release

The JoJoLands is written and illustrated by Hirohiko Araki. It was announced in August 2021 following the conclusion of JoJolion, the previous part of JoJo's Bizarre Adventure, and began serialization in Shueisha's seinen manga magazine Ultra Jump on February 17, 2023.

Chapters

Reception
Interest in the series' launch was enough to prompt a second printing of its debut issue of Ultra Jump – only the fourth time this had happened in Ultra Jump history, and the first time in eleven years.

Notes

References

External links
  

Hawaii in fiction
JoJo's Bizarre Adventure
Seinen manga
Shueisha manga